Fiction Tales is the only studio album by English post-punk band Modern Eon. It was released in 1981 on record label Dindisc and reached No. 65 on the UK Albums Chart.

Track listing

Critical reception 

Trouser Press wrote, "Although not an easy album to like, Fiction Tales does convey originality and stylishness as well as flashes of accessibility; occasional use of odd instrumentation and a good drummer make this more than just a routine genre exercise".

Personnel 

 Danny Hampson – bass guitar
 Cliff Hewitt – drums, timpani
 Tim Lever – guitar, saxophone
 Alix Johnson – guitar, vocals, Chinese horn, piano
 Bob Wakelin – synthesizer, strings, percussion, vocals on "High Noon"

 Technical
 Modern Eon - production
 Lawrence Diana – co-production, engineering

Further reading

References

External links 

 

1981 debut albums
Modern Eon albums